Return to Treasure Island may refer to:

 Return to Treasure Island (1954 film), an American film directed by Ewald André Dupont set in the modern day, with Dawn Addams as Jim Hawkins' descendant
 Long John Silver (film) also known as Long John Silver's Return to Treasure Island is a 1954 American-Australian film, starring Robert Newton as Long John Silver
 Return to Treasure Island (TV series), a 1986 Disney mini-series
 Return to Treasure Island, the US title of the 1988 Soviet two-part animated film Treasure Island